The 2016–17 Clemson Tigers men's basketball team represented Clemson University during the 2016–17 NCAA Division I men's basketball season. Led by sixth-year head coach Brad Brownell, the Tigers played their home games at Littlejohn Coliseum in Clemson, South Carolina after a one-year of renovation, as members of the Atlantic Coast Conference. They finished the season 17–16, 6–12 in ACC play to finish in 12th place. They defeated NC State in the first round of the ACC tournament to advance to the second round where they lost to Duke. They received an invitation to the National Invitation Tournament where they lost in the first round to Oakland.

Previous season
The Tigers finished the 2015–16 season 17–14, 10–8 in ACC play to finish in a tie for seventh place. They lost in the second round of the ACC tournament to Georgia Tech.

Departures

Incoming Transfers

Recruiting class

Recruiting class of 2017

Roster

2017 NBA Draft
The Tigers had one player drafted in the 2017 NBA Draft.

Schedule and results

|-
!colspan=12 style=| Exhibition

|-
!colspan=12 style=| Non-conference regular season

|-
!colspan=12 style=| ACC regular season

|-
!colspan=12 style=| ACC tournament

|-
!colspan=12 style=| NIT

|-

References

Clemson Tigers men's basketball seasons
Clemson
Clemson